Valmiki is a 1946 Tamil-language film starring Honnappa Bhagavathar, U. R. Jeevarathinam, N. C. Vasanthakokilam, T. R. Rajakumari and T. S. Balaiah. It was directed by Sundar Rao Nadkarni.

Plot 

The film was based on the story of the Hindu sage Valmiki (played by Honnappa Bhagavathar), who starts as a bandit and eventually undergoes spiritual transformation into a religious mendicant. Valmiki falls in love with a princess (played by Jeevarathnam), who is kidnapped by the villain (played by T. S. Balaiah).

Cast

Crew 
 Producer: B. Rangaswamy Naidu, S. M. Sriramulu Naidu & Samikannu Vincent
 Production Company: Central Studios
 Director: Sundar Rao Nadkarni
 Music: S. V. Venkataraman
 Lyrics: Papanasam Sivan
 Story: Sundar Rao Nadkarni, Elangovan
 Screenplay:
 Dialogues: A. S. A. Sami
 Art Direction: H. Santaram
 Editing: Sundar Rao Nadkarni
 Choreography: K. R. Kamaar, Heeralal
 Cinematography: P. Ramasamy, Muthusamy
 Stunt:
 Dance:

Soundtrack 
The music was composed by S. V. Venkatraman and the lyrics were penned by Papanasam Sivan
 "Sundarananda Mukunda" by N. C. Vasanthakokilam
 "Poi Thavazhum Maaya Bhoomi" by N. C. Vasanthakokilam
 "Bhagawan Avadharipaar" by N. C. Vasanthakokilam
 "Bhuvimeedhu" by N. C. Vasanthakokilam
 "Ippozhudhe Varuvaar" U. R. Jeevarathinam
 "Bhagyasaaliyum Undo" T. R. Rajakumari

References

External links 
 - a song from the film

1946 films
Indian biographical films
1940s Tamil-language films
Indian black-and-white films
Films directed by Sundar Rao Nadkarni